For the French composer see Henri Montan Berton

Henri Berton was a French archer. He competed at the 1908 Summer Olympics in London. Berton entered the men's double York round event in 1908, taking 16th place (the best finish of a French archer in the event) with 425 points. He then competed in the Continental style contest, placing 8th at 212 points.

References

External links
 
 

Year of birth missing
Year of death missing
Archers at the 1908 Summer Olympics
Olympic archers of France
French male archers